Abel Maxwell, known as Abel, is a North-American singer-songwriter, best-selling author, United Nations (UNESCO) awarded artist born in Dakar, Senegal that grew up in Europe and is now residing in Toronto.

Biography
Abel Maxwell was born to parents of Togolese descent. From an early age, he was interested in music. At the age of seven, he joined the conservatory to learn the piano.

In 2003, he founded a gospel choir in Lyon, France.

In 2008, he released his first album, Abel Maxwell under the French record Alter Ego Music .

In 2015, his second album, Interludes, was released. In the following year, he released another music album, named Rupture, both under the Canadian record label BODB Entertainment .

In February 2020, he released his fourth album, Contradictions and presented it for the 1st time at The Alliance française de Toronto to a crowd of media personalities and influential leaders of the GTA, the Greater Toronto Area.

In February 2023, he released his fifth album “5 Roses” at the Université de l’Ontario français in front of people of influence, notable media professionals covering local and international news residing in Ontario, New Brunswick and West Africa.Abel Maxwell is a bestselling author, artist, and entrepreneur who is currently based in Toronto. He got there from Lyon, France, however, in an act of bravery that saw him switch countries without a safety net of money or social connections, without even knowing the official language. Maxwell managed to thrive, however, and now his journey stands for everyone to take away some important lessons.

Discography
Albums
 Abel Maxwell (2008)
 Interludes (2015)
 Rupture (2016)
 Contradictions (2020)
 5 Roses'' (2023)

References

People from Dakar